Egbert is an unincorporated community in Montgomery County, in the U.S. state of Missouri.

History
A post office called Egbert was established in 1900, and remained in operation until 1907. The community has the name of Egbert Gregory, an early settler.

References

Unincorporated communities in Montgomery County, Missouri
Unincorporated communities in Missouri